Jorge Luque García (born 8 March 1981) is a Spanish former footballer who played as a midfielder.

Club career
Luque was born in Córdoba, Andalusia. During his career, spent in Segunda División or lower, he played for Sevilla Atlético, Mérida UD, Alicante CF, Xerez CD, Córdoba CF, Elche CF, Cádiz CF and FC Cartagena; he appeared in 153 matches over six seasons in that level, scoring nine goals.

With Andalusia's Xerez, Luque appeared in 13 games (five starts, one goal) as the club achieved a first-ever promotion to La Liga in 2009, but never competed in that tier.

References

External links

1981 births
Living people
Footballers from Córdoba, Spain
Spanish footballers
Association football midfielders
Segunda División players
Segunda División B players
Sevilla Atlético players
Mérida UD footballers
Alicante CF footballers
Xerez CD footballers
Córdoba CF players
Elche CF players
Cádiz CF players
FC Cartagena footballers